The year 1986 saw the destruction of Space Shuttle Challenger shortly after lift-off, killing all seven aboard, the first in-flight deaths of American astronauts. This accident followed the successful flight of Columbia just weeks earlier, and dealt a major setback to the U.S. crewed space program, suspending the Shuttle program for 32 months.

The year also saw numerous fly-bys of Halley's Comet as well as other successes.

Launches

|colspan="8"|

January 
|-

|colspan="8"|

February 
|-

|colspan="8"|

March 
|-

|colspan="8"|

April 
|-

|colspan="8"|

May 
|-

|colspan="8"|

August 
|-

|colspan="8"|

September 
|-

|colspan="8"|

November 
|-

|colspan="8"|

December 
|-

|}

Deep space rendezvous

EVAs

References

 
Spaceflight by year